Xanthogalum is a genus of flowering plants in the family Apiaceae. Its species are native to Iran, the Caucasus and Turkey.

Species
, Plants of the World Online accepted the following species:
Xanthogalum purpurascens Avé-Lall.
Xanthogalum sachokianum Karyagin
Xanthogalum tatianae (Bordz.) Schischk.

References 

Apioideae